is a men's volleyball team based in the city of Kariya, Japan. It competes in the V.League, the highest volleyball league in Japan. The club was founded in 1958 and the current owner of the club is JTEKT.

History 
1958: The club was founded as Toyoda Kōki volleyball club.
2002: The club was promoted to V1 League (later renamed the Challenge League).
2006: The club was renamed the JTEKT Stings.
2010: The club won the Challenge League for the first time.
2013: The club was promoted to V.Premier League (later was changed to V.League division 1), the highest league in Japan, after beating Oita Miyoshi Weisse Adler.
2020: The club won V.League division 1 title in Season 2019/20 for the first time in club's history.

Team

Current roster

Former rosters

Notable players
  Ernardo Gómez (2006–2007)
  Fernando Hernández (2013–2015)
  Valentin Bratoev (2018–2019)
  Matey Kaziyski (2015–2018, 2019–2020)
  Hiroaki Asano (2012–2021)
  Yuji Nishida (2017–2021)
  Yamato Fushimi (2019–2021)
  Rao Shuhan (2019–2021)
  Masahiro Yanagida (2022–2023)
  Masahiro Sekita (2022–2023)

Honours
V.League 1 (Highest league)
Champion(1): 2019–20
V1 League/V.Challenge League
Champions(3): 2009–10, 2010–11 and 2012–13
Runners-up(1): 2011–12
Japanese Emperor's Cup
Champions(1): 2020, 2022
Runners-up(1): 2013–14
National Sports Festival of Japan
Champions(1): 2009

League results
 Champions   Runners-up

References

External links 
 JTEKT Stings 

Japanese volleyball teams
Volleyball clubs established in 1958
Sports teams in Aichi Prefecture
1958 establishments in Japan